Lindex is a Swedish fashion chain within the Finnish Stockmann Group. The company has around 5000 employees and approximately 480 stores in 18 markets in the Nordic countries, the Baltic States, Central Europe and the Middle East. In addition to sales in store, Lindex also offers their fashion assortment via online shopping in 28 countries: all EU countries plus Norway. The company has had a rapid international expansion and sales growth. The assortment includes several different concepts within women's wear, lingerie, kids’ wear and cosmetics.

The history of Lindex 
In 1954, Ingemar Boman and Bengt Rosell opened the lingerie store Fynd in Alingsås. Shortly thereafter, the Lindex company of Gothenburg was acquired, and this was the name then given in time to all the subsequent stores. During the sixties the lingerie selection was complemented by women's wear, in particular jumpers and blouses. Operations were expanded and the first Lindex store in Norway was opened.

During the seventies Lindex continued to grow in Sweden and Norway. The assortment was expanded and Lindex also became known for skirts and trousers as well as kids’ wear. The eighties meant major changes for Lindex and the expansion reached record levels. Major changes occurred in the buying routines, since almost all textile manufacturing moved abroad. Lindex now tested new markets such as Denmark, Great Britain and Finland, but by the end of the eighties, operations were focused on Sweden, Norway and Finland.

In 1993 Lindex opened its first production office in Hong Kong and the company started to carry out inspections to check that no child labour occurred at the suppliers. That same year, Lindex sold the fashion chain Gulins with 770 employees to the Norwegian Finansgruppen. The company's requirements on suppliers were increased and a code of conduct for all suppliers was introduced. During the nineties the company also started to make serious efforts with regard to environmental issues. In 1995 the Lindex Club was started - a club for all loyal customers. At the end of the nineties the trademark Fix was acquired, with colourful kids’ wear.

The beginning of the 21st century was characterized by huge international expansion. Lindex looked east and started its expansion in Central Europe and opened stores in the Baltic States, the Czech Republic and Slovakia. In 2007 the Finnish listed company Stockmann became the new owner of Lindex and with their help the Russian market opened up for Lindex. In 2008 Lindex opened its first store in St Petersburg and the following year the first Lindex store in Moscow was opened. In 2009 Lindex opened its first store in Slovakia. During the 2010s Lindex continues to focus on Central Europe. Stores are opened in Prague and Bratislava. Lindex is now one of Europe's largest fashion chains with approximately 480 stores and a turnover of 650 MEUR.

Organisation

Stockmann 
Since December 2007 Lindex is part of the Finnish Stockmann group that is listed on NASDAQ Helsinki. Stockmann has its head office in Helsinki.

Lindex board of directors 
Chairman Lauri Veijalainen, CEO Stockmann

Eva Hamilton, Senior Advisor Arholma landsort, former CEO SVT

Rossana Mariano, CEO and founder RMPR

Tracy Stone Munn, Global Sales Director L.K Bennet

Susanne Najafi, Entrepreneur and founder BackingMinds

Employee Representatives: Caroline Kull Magnusson and Ann-Britt Neckvall

Deputies: Clary Erenman and Cecilia Dahlström

Head office 
Lindex head office is located in Gothenburg, where approximately 400 people work in buying, design, marketing, IT, communication, human resources, finance, logistics and distribution

Stores 
Lindex is one of Europe's leading fashion chains with approximately 480 stores in 18 markets and Lindex Shop Online available in 32 countries.

Country office 
Lindex has country offices in Sweden, Norway, Finland, the Czech Republic and England. Country offices are responsible for the results and store operations, but also that the Lindex concept is realized in the stores.

Production 
Lindex does not own any factories, instead they work with independent suppliers and factories around the world. Lindex has production offices in the main production markets - China, Hong Kong, Bangladesh, India, Turkey, Myanmar, Sri Lanka and Pakistan.

Lindex offers women's wear, kids’ wear, lingerie and cosmetics.

Women’s wear 
Lindex assortment consist of three core concept: Easy, Sharp and Holly & Whyte. Besides these three core concepts, Lindex also has a cosmetic brand (Lindex beauty) and an assortment with maternity wear and a range of accessories.

Lingerie 
Lindex started as a lingerie store in Alingsås, Sweden. The company is the market leader of lingerie in Scandinavia. The bra concept is called Bra-volution and consists of 14 different fits for many different needs, body shapes and preferences. Each fit is available in several styles with different materials and colours to choose from and the customer can always match her bra with a variety of panties. The bra assortment is designed after extensive tests in which women of various ages, bra sizes and preferences tested several fits. In addition to the wide assortment Lindex also has the lingerie collections Ella M and So.U and offer socks, hosiery, nightwear and swimwear.

Kids’ wear 
Lindex is the market leader in kids’ wear in Sweden. Lindex works with a wide assortment consisting of tops and bottoms, outerwear, nightwear, underwear, swimwear and various types of accessories. The collections are created in three groups: Newborn collection in sizes 44-86, toddlers in sizes 92 -122, and sizes 128-170 for the oldest children. Today 100% of the Newborn assortment is made of more sustainable materials.

Omni 

Lindex started Shop Online in Sweden in 2007. In 2010 the Shop online was launched for Finland and 2011 it was launched in Norway and all EU countries.

Designer collaborations 

2009-2011 Ewa Larsson

2010 Narciso Rodriguez

2011 Rachel Zoe - stylist collaboration

2012 Missoni

2013 Matthew Williamson

2014 Jean Paul Gaultier

Models 

2005 Emma Wiklund

2007 Izabella Scorupco

2007 Alec Wek

2007 Mini Andén

2008 Caroline Winberg

2010-2011 Carmen Kass

2011 Reese Witherspoon

2012 Gwyneth Paltrow

2013 Penélope Cruz

2014 Kate Hudson

2014 Karen Elson

2016 Sienna Mieller

2016 Ashley Graham

Stores

Own stores: 438 
Sweden: 210

Norway: 100

Finland: 60

Czech Republic: 26

Estonia: 10

Latvia: 9

Slovakia: 9

Lithuania: 9

Poland: 3

UK: 2

Franchise: 43 
Saudi Arabia: 17

Bosnia and Herzegovina: 10 (+ Shop Online)

Serbia: 6 (+ Shop Online)

Iceland: 6 (+ Shop Online)

Kosovo: 2

Albania: 1

Tunisia : 1

Qatar: 2

Denmark: 1

Total number of stores: 483

See also 
 List of Swedish companies

References

Companies based in Gothenburg
Clothing retailers of Sweden
Clothing companies of Sweden
Swedish brands
1954 establishments in Sweden
Clothing companies established in 1954
Retail companies established in 1954
Multinational companies headquartered in Sweden